Ananta is a mountain in the Arequipa Region in the Andes of Peru, about  high. It is situated in the Caylloma Province, on the border of the districts Achoma and Yanque. Ananta lies east of the dormant volcano Ampato and south-west of the mountain Warank'anthi.

References 

Mountains of Peru
Mountains of Arequipa Region